Weaver Levy was a Chinese American character actor who had a long career in Hollywood that began in the 1940s and continued through the early 1980s. He was best known for his main role in the TV series Adventures in Paradise.

Biography 
Weaver was born in Los Angeles, California, to Charles Lee and Gladys Wong. He and his siblings were given the last name Levy, which was apparently an Anglicization of their father's given surname. He reported that he often had trouble cashing checks because people did not believe his last name could be Levy. While working as an actor, he also owned an electronics store in North Hollywood, California. He died on February 8, 2018.

Selected filmography 

 Objective, Burma! (1945) - Chinese Captain (uncredited)
 Betrayal from the East (1945) - Panama Cabbie-Spy (uncredited)
 God Is My Co-Pilot (1945) - Japanese Pilot (uncredited)
 China Sky (1945) - (uncredited)
 First Yank Into Tokyo (1945) - Japanese Soldier (uncredited)
 Prison Ship (1945) - Japanese Guard (uncredited)
 Little Mister Jim (1946) - Chinese Clerk (uncredited)
 Dangerous Millions (1946) - Guard (uncredited)
 The Beginning or the End (1947) - Japanese Sailor (uncredited)
 The Secret Life of Walter Mitty (1947) - Waiter in Chinese Restaurant (uncredited)
 Singapore (1947) - Bellboy (uncredited)
 April Showers (1948) - Elevator Operator (uncredited)
 Half Past Midnight (1948) - Chinese Warehouse Workman (uncredited)
 Night Has a Thousand Eyes (1948) - Young Chinese Man (uncredited)
 Malaya (1949) - Japanese Aide (uncredited)
 I Was an American Spy (1951) - Japanese Guard (uncredited)
 China Corsair (1951) - Kam (uncredited)
 Peking Express (1951) - Chinese Officer (uncredited)
 Fixed Bayonets! (1951) - Communist Tank Leader (uncredited)
 Japanese War Bride (1952) - Kioto
 Macao (1952) - Chang (uncredited)
 The Miraculous Blackhawk: Freedom's Champion (1952, Serial) - Chop Chop
 Target Hong Kong (1953) - Lo Chi (uncredited)
 From Here to Eternity (1953) - Bartender (uncredited)
 Mission Over Korea (1953) - Guerrilla (uncredited)
 Flight Nurse (1953) - North Korean (uncredited)
 Forbidden (1953) - Tang
 Hell and High Water (1954) - Asian Man (uncredited)
 Prisoner of War (1954) - Red Guard
 The Shanghai Story (1954) - Sampan Captain (uncredited)
 The Bamboo Prison (1954) - Meatball
 Love Is a Many-Splendored Thing (1955) - Soldier (uncredited)
 The Conqueror (1956) - Mongol (uncredited)
 The King and I (1956) - Whipping Guard (uncredited)
 Hold Back the Night (1956) - Chinese Lieutenant (uncredited)
 Around the World in 80 Days (1956) - Minor Role (uncredited)
 China Gate (1957) - Khuan
 The 27th Day (1957) - Chinese Sergeant (uncredited)
 Jet Attack (1958) - Orderly
 Flower Drum Song (1961) - Policeman (uncredited)
 Satan Never Sleeps (1962) - Ho San
 The Young and the Brave (1963) - Communist Soldier
 The Wrecking Crew (1968) - Kim
 The Girl Who Knew Too Much (1969) - Wong See
 MASH (1970) - Korean Doctor (uncredited)
 Sharky's Machine (1981) - Chin No. 2 (final film role)

References 

American male actors of Chinese descent
1925 births
2018 deaths
American male television actors
American male film actors